Diaprioidea is a hymenopteran superfamily containing five extant families, though in the past these families were included in the superfamily Proctotrupoidea.

References

Parasitica
Apocrita superfamilies